The Marriage Price is a 1919 American silent romantic drama film produced by Famous Players-Lasky and distributed through Paramount Pictures and Artcraft. Emile Chautard directed and Elsie Ferguson stars. This film is lost.

Plot
As described in a film magazine, Helen Tremaine (Ferguson) is an extravagant daughter of a wealthy New York man, but becomes impoverished by his death and disillusioned when her friends leave her, save Frederick Lawton (Standing), a man of power and wealth. She does not love Lawton and prefers Kenneth Gordon (Atwill), but he says he is too poor to marry her. She attempts to support herself, but even fails at a job as a film actress. Nearly starving, she marries Lawton as a last resort. He tests her by making her financially independent through a pretend heritage of hers that he claims to have discovered, but she remains a girl of her word. All is well until her former love shows up to win her with a scheme that will enrich him while ruining her husband. The deal goes through, but it is a trap set up by her husband to show her the type of man her former love was. She now sees the nobility in her husband with happy results.

Cast

References

External links

The Marriage Price synopsis; allmovie.com
Still from production with Elsie Ferguson and unidentified actress(?Carrie Clark Ward)
Lantern slide

1919 films
American silent feature films
Lost American films
Famous Players-Lasky films
Films directed by Emile Chautard
1919 romantic drama films
American romantic drama films
American black-and-white films
1910s American films
Silent romantic drama films
Silent American drama films
1910s English-language films